The Popular Democratic Front, shortened name of the Popular Democratic Front for Freedom, Peace, Labour (Fronte Democratico Popolare per la libertà, la pace, il lavoro) was a left-wing political coalition in Italy. Formed by the Italian Socialist Party (PSI) and the Italian Communist Party (PCI), it contested the 1948 Italian general election.

History
The coalition was formed for the 1948 general election and consisted of the PSI and PCI. Its symbol was a green star surmounted by an image of Italian Unification hero Giuseppe Garibaldi. The Social Christian Party (PCS) and Sardinian Action Party (PSd'Az) were not allied with the coalition, and formed their own electoral lists. The right-wing of the PSI opposed the Front, left the party, and organised a separate list as Socialist Unity; this group later became the Italian Democratic Socialist Party (PSDI).
 
The election of 1948 was perhaps the most important in Italian republican history: the choice of future alliance with United States or with the Soviet Union was at issue. The Popular Front got 31.0% of the vote for the Chamber of Deputies (30.8% of the Senate of the Republic vote). Following the victory of Christian Democracy with 48.5%, Italy became a founding member of NATO in 1949.

According to historians Elena Aga-Rossi and Victor Zaslavsky, it was the largest communist party in Western Europe.

Composition

Election results

References

1947 establishments in Italy
1948 disestablishments in Italy
Defunct political party alliances in Italy
Political parties disestablished in 1948
Political parties established in 1947
Popular fronts